Was (Not Was) is an American pop rock group founded in 1979 in Detroit, Michigan, by David Weiss and Don Fagenson, who adopted the stage names David Was and Don Was. Their song catalog features an eclectic mix of pop and rock styles, often featuring guest musicians from across the musical spectrum. The band went on indefinite hiatus in the mid-1990s, but has returned sporadically since the turn of the millennium. Their most recent release was the 2008 album Boo!.

Career

Beginnings
Weiss and Fagenson were childhood friends who grew up together in suburban Detroit, Michigan, United States. Partly due to Fagenson's poverty they decided to form Was (Not Was) in 1979. The name of the band was derived from Fagenson's then-infant son Tony, who was just beginning to talk and enjoyed contradicting words such as "Blue" with "Not Blue". Their first recording was "Wheel Me Out", a 12-inch dance record for the avant-garde ZE Records. David's mother Elizabeth Elkin Weiss, an actress and radio pioneer in their native Detroit, provided the outré vocals. The track was later included on the 2000 compilation album Disco Not Disco.

Their first album Was (Not Was) (1981) was an amalgam of rock, disco, Weiss's beat poetry, Reagan-era political-social commentary, and jazz. On vocals they recruited Harry Bowens and "Sweet Pea" Atkinson, who frequently found themselves singing absurdist and satirical songs alongside tender ballads. Wayne Kramer of MC5, The Knack's Doug Fieger, Charles Mingus, and trumpeter Marcus Belgrave were among the guest players.

In 1982, the group played on Don't Walk Away, a solo album for lead singer "Sweet Pea" Atkinson.

Development
Born to Laugh at Tornadoes (1983) had even more guest musicians, including Ozzy Osbourne rapping over electro, Mitch Ryder singing a techno-rockabilly number, Mel Tormé performing a ballad about asphyxiation, and an abstract funk piece called "Man vs. the Empire Brain Building". Singer Donald Ray Mitchell joined the group as third lead vocalist.

In 1988, they found their biggest hit with the album What Up, Dog?, which featured the singles "Walk the Dinosaur" and "Spy in the House of Love". Special guests included Stevie Salas, John Patitucci, Frank Sinatra Jr., and a writing credit from Elvis Costello.

Film and animation work
Artist/animator Christoph Simon created videos to accompany some of their stranger album tracks, such as "What Up, Dog?", "Dad I'm in Jail," and the Tom Waits-style "Earth to Doris." The videos appeared on MTV's Liquid Television and in various film festivals, including the Spike & Mike festival. Around this time, the Was Brothers developed separate careers as producers, film scorers, and music supervisors.

Hiatus
The group followed up with Are You Okay? in 1990, spearheaded by a cover of "Papa Was a Rollin' Stone". Guest musicians included Iggy Pop, Leonard Cohen, The Roches, and Syd Straw. After a tour with Dire Straits in 1992 and a UK Top 5 single with "Shake Your Head", which included vocals from Ozzy Osbourne and Kim Basinger, Weiss and Fagenson drifted apart, subsequently releasing only a compilation album Hello Dad... I'm in Jail. Some members, however, did appear on Don's Orquestra Was project Forever Is a Long Long Time (1997), which re-interpreted Hank Williams in a jazz/R&B vein.

Reunion
In late 2004, Was (Not Was) reformed for a two-month club tour through the US, including stops at the House of Blues in Cleveland and Chicago and the Trocadero in Philadelphia. In October 2005, they played four gigs at the Jazz Café in London.

In 2008, they released their fifth studio album, Boo!, featuring guest appearances from Kris Kristofferson, Wayne Kramer, Marcus Miller and Booker T. Jones, plus a song originally co-written with Bob Dylan nearly 20 years earlier. On April 22, they performed on the British show Later... with Jools Holland, and on May 2, they were the musical guest on Late Night with Conan O'Brien. The band toured the US that year, beginning on April 30.

Commentary
Writing in Detroit's Metro Times, Brian J. Bowe described the band as "an endearing mess....a sausage factory of funk, rock, jazz and electronic dance music, all providing a boogie-down backdrop for a radical (and witty) political message of unbridled personal freedom and skepticism of authority."

Discography

Studio albums

Compilation albums

Singles

Contributions
 A Christmas Record (1981, ZE Records) - "Christmas Time in the Motor City"
 That's the Way I Feel Now: A Tribute to Thelonious Monk (1984, A&M Records) - "Ba-Lue-Bolivar-Ba-Lues-Are"
 Stay Awake: Various Interpretations of Music from Vintage Disney Films (1988, A&M Records) - "Baby Mine"

See also
 List of number-one dance hits (United States)
 List of artists who reached number one on the US Dance chart

References

External links
 World Wide Was
 
 Was (Not Was) collection at the Internet Archive's live music archive
 
 

American funk musical groups
American post-disco music groups
Rykodisc artists
Geffen Records artists
Chrysalis Records artists
Musical groups from Detroit
Musical groups established in 1979
Musical groups reestablished in 2004
ZE Records artists
Fontana Records artists